Jaśliska Landscape Park (Jaśliski Park Krajobrazowy) is a protected area (Landscape Park) in south-eastern Poland, established in 1992. It is named after the village of Jaśliska.

The Park lies within Podkarpackie Voivodeship. It covers an area of 258.78 square kilometers.

Within the Landscape Park are five nature reserves.

References 

Landscape parks in Poland
Parks in Podkarpackie Voivodeship
Krosno County